The Iverson Award, more formally the Kenneth E. Iverson Award for Outstanding Contribution to APL, is presented by the Special Interest Group on APL (SIGAPL) of the Association for Computing Machinery (ACM). It is presented to a person who has made significant contributions to the APL programming language or to the APL community.  These contributions may be Technical (i.e. new developments in the APL language itself) or Service (assistance or support to SIGAPL or the APL community generally). The award consists of a plaque and a certificate, and is accompanied by a cash prize and a lifetime membership in SIGAPL.

The award is named in honor of Kenneth E. Iverson, the creator of APL.

Recipients of the award by year:
 2016 Morten Kromberg and Gitte Christensen
 2007 IBM APL2 Products and Services Team
 2001 Jon McGrew
 2000 Lynne Shaw 
 1999 William Rutiser 
 1998 Roy Sykes, Jr. 
 1997 John C. McPherson 
 1996 Roger Hui
 1995 Peter Donnelly and John Scholes  
 1994 Donald B. McIntyre (geologist) 
 1993 James A. Brown
 1991 Phil Abrams
 1990 Ray Polivka
 1989 Philip Van Cleave
 1988 Al Rose (Allen J. Rose)
 1987 Eugene McDonnell
 1986 Raymond Tisserand, Clark Wiedmann, and Alex Morrow 
 1985 Dan Dyer and Ian Sharp 
 1984 Garth Foster 
 1983 Adin Falkoff

See also

 List of computer-related awards

References

Computer-related awards
APL programming language family